Henk de Hoog (12 August 1918 – 8 May 1973) was a Dutch racing cyclist. He rode in the 1948 and 1949 Tour de France.

References

External links

1918 births
1973 deaths
Dutch male cyclists
Cyclists from Amsterdam
20th-century Dutch people